Nematollah (also Romanized as Ne‘matollāh; also known as Neimatullah) is a village in Mishu-e Jonubi Rural District, Sufian District, Shabestar County, East Azerbaijan Province, Iran. At the 2006 census, its population was 771, in 195 families.

References 

Populated places in Shabestar County